Rockefeller is a live album by Norwegian rock band Seigmen, recorded during their 2006 reunion.

Track listing
 "Ohm" - 4:14
 "Nemesis" - 6:00
 "Slaver Av Solen" 4:25
 "Colosseum" - 6:39
 "Juvel" - 5:04
 "Döderlein" - 4:42
 "In Limbo" - 6:07
 "Metropolis" - 5:01
 "Nihil" - 4:37
 "Mesusah" - 9:33
 "Lament" - 5:20
 "Hjernen Er Alene" - 7:16
 "In Oblivion" - 6:01

Personnel
Alex Møklebust - Lead vocals
Kim Ljung - Bass guitar, vocals
Noralf Ronthi - drums
Marius Roth Christensen - Electric guitar
Sverre Økshoff - Electric guitar

Seigmen albums
2006 live albums